Edward Moreno Alonso is a Puerto Rican educator and former Secretary of Education of Puerto Rico.

Moreno has been a public servant since 1984. During his career, he has received the Manuel A. Pérez Award, which is the highest recognition for public servants in the island. He has also served as Deputy Secretary of Education.

In 2011, with the resignation of Secretary of Education Jesús Rivera Sánchez, Moreno assumed the role on an interim basis. On November 2011, he said he was available to fill the position on a permanent basis. About a month later, Governor Luis Fortuño officially appointed him for the position. He was confirmed by the Senate of Puerto Rico on December 20, 2011.

Moreno ran for District Senator on the 2008 PNP primaries, but lost.

External links
Departamento de Educación de Puerto Rico

References

Living people
Members of the 15th Cabinet of Puerto Rico
Puerto Rican educators
Secretaries of Education of Puerto Rico
Year of birth missing (living people)